Iván Leonardo López Licht (born 13 May 1978) is a former Colombian footballer. He primarily played as a central defender, and was called El Centre de oro, "the golden centre", although he also played as a right wingback. López was projected to be a great player, but his career was frustrated and eventually ended early by injuries. He mostly played at Colombian clubs, and is most known for his performances for Independiente Santa Fe. As an international player for Colombia he was part of the squad that won the 2001 Copa América.

Club career 
López spent his youth career at Independiente Santa Fe of Bogotá, making his professional debut for them in 1998. During his time there, he was named Bogotá Sportsman of the Year several times, and selected for the national team. In 2002, he moved to América de Cali, but he returned to Santa Fe the next year. In 2005, he started playing for Millonarios Fútbol Club. Toward the end of the season, he was injured badly enough that he could not play in the next season.

Later in the 2006 season, López signed with the second-division Ecuadorean club Deportivo Azogues to try to revive his career, but after only four games he had to withdraw due to another injury. Three years later in 2009, he tried to return to his professional career at Atlético Bucaramanga, but never played a game for the team.

International career 
As an international player, he made 11 caps for Colombia. He made his international debut in 1999, and was part of the squad that came second in the 2000 CONCACAF Gold Cup. A free kick he took in the final of the Copa América in 2001 was converted into a goal by Iván Córdoba, giving Colombia its first title in the cup.

References

External links 

Tripod 

1978 births
Living people
Footballers from Bogotá
Association football central defenders
Colombian footballers
Colombia international footballers
2000 CONCACAF Gold Cup players
2001 Copa América players
Copa América-winning players
Independiente Santa Fe footballers
América de Cali footballers
Millonarios F.C. players
Deportivo Azogues footballers
Atlético Bucaramanga footballers
Categoría Primera A players
Colombian expatriate footballers
Expatriate footballers in Ecuador